Karin Roten Meier (born 27 January 1976, in Leukerbad) is a Swiss retired alpine skier. She won two FIS Alpine Ski World Cup races in her career. She competed at the 1994 Winter Olympics and the 1998 Winter Olympics.

World Cup victories

References

External links 
 official site 

1976 births
Swiss female alpine skiers
Living people
People from Leukerbad
Olympic alpine skiers of Switzerland
Alpine skiers at the 1994 Winter Olympics
Alpine skiers at the 1998 Winter Olympics
Sportspeople from Valais